"Babylónia" (Babel) is a song by Marika Gombitová released on OPUS in 1990.

The music composed Gombitová, while Kamil Peteraj contributed with lyrics as usually. Following the track being issued as the pilot song taken from the singer's ninth studio album Kam idú ľudia?, its music video presented the artist on the Austrian chart Die Großen Zehn by ORF, becoming the first such case for any Czechoslovak entertainer by June 20, 1990.

Official versions
 "Babylónia" – Studio version, 1990

Credits and personnel
 Marika Gombitová – lead vocal, music
 Andrej Šeban – keyboards, guitars, drums programming, arranger
 Kamil Peteraj – lyrics
 Norbert Bóka – synthetizers programming
 Stanislav Beňačka – chorus
 Adriena Bartošová – chorus
 Elena Matúšová – chorus
 Jana Küthreibová – chorus
 Peter Smolinský – producer
 Ivan Jombík – soud director
 Michal Ivanický – technical collaboration
 Štefan Danko – responsible editor

References

General

Specific

External links 
 

1990 songs
Marika Gombitová songs
Songs written by Marika Gombitová
Songs written by Kamil Peteraj
Slovak-language songs